Pavel Cuzuioc (born 1978) is an Austrian, Moldovan, Romanian filmmaker.

Early life and education
Cuzuioc was born in Moldova. After studying law in Bucharest, Romania, he graduated from the State University of Moldova. In 2000, Pavel moved to Austria, where he took a Post-Graduate Diploma in International Studies at the Diplomatic Academy of Vienna. From 2003, he followed courses on film directing at the University of Music and Performing Arts Vienna, and since then has been working as a filmmaker in Austria, Romania, and Moldova.

Career
Pavel's films have been screened and won several awards at various international film festivals such as Locarno Film Festival, IDFA, Hot Docs, Sheffield Doc/Fest, Clermont-Ferrand, Tallinn Black Nights Film Festival, DocAviv, TIFF, FIPA, VIENNALE, and others.

Cuzuioc's DOINA GROPARILOR aka DIGGING FOR LIFE (2011) is a 55 minutes documentary, produced by HBO Europe, on the career gravediggers at Moldova's Doina cemetery—the largest in Eastern Europe, comprising some 250,000 graves spread out over two million square meters of land. The film was screened in 2012 at TIFF, FIPA, Astra Film Festival and at Lincoln Center in New York City during the Making Waves: New Romanian Cinema Festival.

His short film RAISA (2015), starring Cristina Flutur, was selected on over 100 festivals, including Clermont-Ferrand, Cottbus, Fribourg, Vienna Independent Shorts and won several awards at the Tallinn Black Nights Film Festival, Sunscreen Film Festival (USA), Kyrgyzstan ISFF, International FF of Uruguay, Seanema Film Festival (Montenegro). RAISA was broadcast on ARTE and HBO CE.

Before the theatrical release in Austria, Cuzuioc's SECONDO ME (2016) documentary premiered in Semaine de la Critique  of Locarno Film Festival and had its North American premiere at Hot Docs Canadian International Documentary Festival, Canada. The film won Best Cinematography Award at DOCUART Film Festival in Bucharest, Romania and the Audience Award at Cronograf Film Festival in Chisinau. SECONDO ME was broadcast in March 2019 on 3sat.
The film follows three cloakroom attendants at three European opera houses: Vienna State Opera, La Scala in Milan and Odessa Opera House. The film reverses the natural order of things, relegating the opera houses and operatic performances to the background, and bringing the ancillary staff to the fore.

Cuzuioc's second feature documentary PLEASE HOLD THE LINE (2020) premiered at Sheffield Doc/Fest and received the Special Jury Mention at the Astra Film Festival in Sibiu, Romania. The film was part of the Best of Fests section at the International Documentary Film Festival Amsterdam (IDFA)  and received The Erste Bank's ExtraVALUE-Film Prize at the Vienna International Film Festival (VIENNALE)

Cuzuioc also works as sound field recordist and collaborated with film directors as Nikolaus Geyrhalter, Thomas Ciulei, Cristian Mungiu, Alexandru Solomon, and Christian D. Bruun.

Filmography

Please hold the line (2020) - director, producer, writer, cinematographer
Secondo me (2016) - director, producer, writer
Raisa (2015) - director, producer, writer
Doina groparilor (2011) - director, writer, cinematographer
Trois femmes de Moldavie (2006) - director, producer, writer

References

External links
 Austrian Film Commission (in English and German) 
 Ziarul Metropoli (in Romanian)
 Ziarul de Garda (in Russian and Romanian)
 Official website
 Pavel Cuzuioc on IMDb

1978 births
Living people
Moldova State University alumni
University of Music and Performing Arts Vienna alumni
Australian filmmakers